The king rail (Rallus elegans) is a waterbird, the largest North American rail.

Description

Distinct features are a long bill with a slight downward curve, with adults being brown on the back and rusty-brown on the face and breast with a dark brown cap. They also have a white throat and a light belly with barred flanks. Immature birds are covered in down, with light brown on the head and darker brown on the back and wings.

This bird's call is a low repeated grunt transcribed as kek-kek-kek.

Distribution and Habitat
This bird breeds in marshes in eastern North America. Birds along the southeastern coasts of the United States are permanent residents. Other birds migrate to the southern United States and Mexico; in Canada, they are found in southern Ontario. An adult King Rail will molt completely after nesting and it becomes flightless for almost a month.

Ecology
This bird is diurnal, contrasting with its smaller, nocturnal relatives.

Breeding
The nest is a raised platform built with marsh vegetation and covered by a canopy. This is to hide the eggs of this bird from predators that are searching from above.

The king rail interbreeds with the clapper rail where their ranges overlap; some researchers believe that these two birds belong to the same species.

The king rail lays a clutch of 6 to 14 pale buff eggs with brown spotting. They usually measure . Both parents incubate the eggs for 21 to 23 days. When the eggs hatch, the young are covered in down and are able to leave the nest. They are not able to feed themselves, though, and thus must rely on their parents for food for up to six weeks after they hatch.

Feeding
This rail forages in shallow water near cover and eats mainly aquatic insects and crustaceans. It forages by probing the mud while moving around in shallow water.

The chicks are fed small arthropod prey by their parents. The prey is transferred from one parent's beak to that of the chick.

In the males, they will give food to whoever it mates with during engagement.

Status
These birds are still common in some coastal areas, although interior populations have declined due to habitat loss. In Michigan, it is considered a legally protected state endangered species, at an imperiled level.

References

External links
 
 
 
 
 
 
 

king rail
Birds of Cuba
Birds of Mexico
Native birds of the Eastern United States
Near threatened fauna of North America
king rail